Sequiel Sanchez (born ) is a Puerto Rican male volleyball player. With his club Guaynabo Mets he competed at the 2014 FIVB Volleyball Men's Club World Championship.

Achievements

Puerto Rican national team 
Team
 2014 Central American and Caribbean Games: Runner-up
 2017 Men's Pan-American Volleyball Cup: Runner-up
 2018 Central American and Caribbean Games; Champion
Individual
 2018 Central American and Caribbean Games: Second Best Spiker
 2018 Central American and Caribbean Games; Most Valuable Player

References

External links
 profile at FIVB.org

1990 births
Living people
People from San Sebastián, Puerto Rico
Puerto Rican men's volleyball players
Place of birth missing (living people)
Volleyball players at the 2011 Pan American Games
Puerto Rican expatriate sportspeople in Romania
Expatriate volleyball players in Romania
Central American and Caribbean Games gold medalists for Puerto Rico
Competitors at the 2018 Central American and Caribbean Games
Central American and Caribbean Games medalists in volleyball
Pan American Games competitors for Puerto Rico